The 2021 FIBA 3x3 Europe Cup was the sixth edition of the European 3x3 basketball event that featured separate competitions for men's and women's national teams. It was held between 10 and 12 September 2021 in Paris, France.

Qualification

The qualification events took place in 25-26 June in Tel Aviv, Israel and 26-27 June in Constanta, Romania, respectively. Twelve men's teams and 12 women's team qualified for the final tournament. In the men's, host France, 2019 champs Serbia, Russia and Slovenia have qualified based on ranking. In the women's, host and 2019 champs France, Russia, Netherlands and Romania are automatically through. In each qualifying tournament, four men's teams and four women's teams earned spots for the final event.

Medalists

Men's tournament

Preliminary round
Pool A

Pool B

Pool C

Pool D

Knockout stage 
All times are local.

Final standings

Women's tournament

Preliminary round
Pool A

Pool B

Pool C

Pool D

Knockout stage 
All times are local.

Final standings

References

2021
2021 in 3x3 basketball
2021 in European sport
2021 in French sport
2021
2021
September 2021 sports events in France